Bucklow was an electoral ward of Trafford covering the town of Partington and the village of Carrington.

The ward was abolished in 2004, and most of its area incorporated into the new Bucklow-St. Martins Ward.

Its electoral history since 1973 is as follows:

References

External links
Trafford Council

Wards of Trafford
1974 establishments in England
Former wards of the United Kingdom